Derry Rachman Noor (born 15 December 1994) is an Indonesian professional footballer who plays as a left back for Liga 1 club PSS Sleman.

Club career

PS Mojokerto Putra
In 2018, Derry Rachman signed a one-year contract with Indonesian Liga 2 club PS Mojokerto Putra. He made 25 league appearances for PS Mojokerto Putra.

PSS Sleman
He was signed for PSS Sleman to play in Liga 1 in the 2019 season. Derry made his league debut on 31 May 2019 in a match against Persipura Jayapura at the Mandala Stadium, Jayapura.

Honours

Club 
PSS Sleman
 Menpora Cup third place: 2021

References

External links
 Derry Rachman at Soccerway
 Derry Rachman at Liga Indonesia

1994 births
Living people
Indonesian footballers
Association football defenders
Liga 2 (Indonesia) players
Liga 1 (Indonesia) players
Kalteng Putra F.C. players
PS Mojokerto Putra players
PSS Sleman players
People from Bontang
Sportspeople from East Kalimantan